Prince of Wales–Hyder Census Area is a census area located in the U.S. state of Alaska. As of the 2020 census, the population was 5,753, up from 5,559 in 2010. It is part of the unorganized borough and therefore has no borough seat. Its largest communities are Metlakatla and Craig. It was formerly part of the Census Bureau's Prince of Wales–Outer Ketchikan Census Area, but the name was changed in 2008 after most of the Outer Ketchikan (except the parts near the community of Hyder, and Annette Island) was lost to annexation by the Ketchikan Gateway Borough.

Geography

The present-day Prince of Wales–Hyder Census Area includes the Hyder area as an exclave, and Annette Island, which is mostly surrounded by territory of Ketchikan Gateway Borough. Before the transfer of territory, Ketchikan Gateway Borough was enclaved within (surrounded by) the census area.

Adjacent boroughs and census areas
 Petersburg Borough – north
 City and Borough of Wrangell, Alaska – northeast
 Ketchikan Gateway Borough – between Prince of Wales and Hyder
 Regional District of Kitimat-Stikine, British Columbia, Canada – east
 North Coast Regional District, British Columbia, Canada – south (water boundary only, across Dixon Entrance to Hecate Strait)
 Hoonah–Angoon Census Area, Alaska
 City and borough of Sitka, Alaska

National protected areas
 Alaska Maritime National Wildlife Refuge (part of Gulf of Alaska unit)
 Forrester Island Wilderness
 Tongass National Forest (part)
 Karta River Wilderness
 Maurille Islands Wilderness
 South Prince of Wales Wilderness
 Warren Island Wilderness

Demographics

At the 2000 census there were 6,146 people, 2,262 households, and 1,535 families residing in the then-census area. The racial makeup of the census area was 53.12% White, 0.15% African American, 38.68% Native American, 0.36% Asian, 0.05% Pacific Islander, 0.50% from other races, and 7.14% from two or more races. Hispanic or Latino of any race were 1.74% of any race.
Of the 2,262 households, 37.60% had children under the age of 18 living with them, 50.80% were married couples living together, 10.00% have a woman whose husband does not live with her, and 32.10% were non-families. 26.00% of households were one person, and 5.00% were one person aged 65 or older.  The average household size was 2.68 and the average family size was 3.25.

In the census area the population was spread out, with 31.00% under the age of 18, 7.50% from 18 to 24, 30.10% from 25 to 44, 25.80% from 45 to 64, and 5.70% 65 or older.  The median age was 35 years. For every 100 females, there were 119.80 males.  For every 100 females age 18 and over, there were 125.60 males.

Communities

Cities

 Coffman Cove
 Craig
 Edna Bay
 Hydaburg
 Kake
 Kasaan
 Klawock
 Port Alexander
 Thorne Bay
 Whale Pass

Census-designated places 

 Hollis
 Hyder
 Metlakatla
 Naukati Bay
 Point Baker
 Port Protection

Unincorporated Community 
 Waterfall

Indian reservation
 Annette Island Reserve

See also
 List of airports in Alaska

References

External links

 Prince of Wales–Outer Ketchikan Census Area map, 2000 census: Alaska Department of Labor
 Prince of Wales–Hyder Census Area map, 2010 census: Alaska Department of Labor
 Prince of Wales–Hyder Census Area map, January 2014: Alaska Department of Labor

 
Alaska census areas
2008 establishments in Alaska